Bornambusc is a commune in the Seine-Maritime department in the Normandy region in northern France.

Heraldry
The helmet belongs to the d'Harnois de Blangues family.

Geography
Guy de Maupassant spent time hunting in the Château de Bornambusc (a medieval Jagdschloss) throughout his life, visiting his cousin and dear friend Germer d'Harnois de Blangues. The author was inspired by his cousin's property whose descriptions appear in many of his works, particularly in his novel "Une Vie".

Population

Places of interest
 The ruins of the 13th century chateau of Clércy.
 The church of St.Laurent, with parts dating from the thirteenth century.

See also
Communes of the Seine-Maritime department

References

Communes of Seine-Maritime